Ennarukil Nee Irunthal is a 1991 Indian Tamil-language film, directed by Sundar K. Vijayan, starring Chi. Guru Dutt and Priyanka .

Cast 
 Chi. Guru Dutt
 Priyanka
 Chinni Jayanth
 Mayilsamy
 Meesai Murugesan

Soundtrack

References

External links
 Ennarukil Nee Irunthal

1990 films
1991 films
Films scored by Ilaiyaraaja
1990s Tamil-language films